Joe Blade is the first game in the Joe Blade series. It reached the top of the UK game charts, replacing Renegade. In Germany, the game peaked at number 7.

Gameplay

The first Joe Blade title portrayed Blade as a lone commando sent into an evil mastermind's complex to release a number of diplomats.

Reception
Ron Stewart for Page 6 said "It is not a great game, but for under a tenner what do you expect. There is enough game play here to keep you going for a while."

Arnie Katz & Joyce Worley for Ahoy!'s AmigaUser said "Joe Blade is an exceptionally well programmed product. Its animated illustrations and jaunty soundtrack give it an edge over numerous other "storm-the-fortress" epics."

Computer and Video Games said "Nice and cheap with ace graphics, Joe Blade certainly cuts it. A good buy."

Crash said "extremely playable and addictive."

Reviews
MegaJoystick (Spanish)
Amstrad Accion (Spanish)
Zzap! - Nov, 1987
Atari User - Nov, 1988
The Games Machine - Mar, 1988
Commodore User - Oct, 1987
Compute's Amiga Resource - Feb, 1990
Atari ST User - Jul, 1988
ASM (Aktueller Software Markt) - Oct, 1987
Your Sinclair #23

References

1987 video games
Amiga games
Amstrad CPC games
Atari 8-bit family games
Atari ST games
BBC Micro and Acorn Electron games
Joe Blade 2
Commodore 64 games
MSX games
Platform games
Video games developed in the United Kingdom
War video games
ZX Spectrum games